Paul Baker may refer to:

 Paul G. Baker (1910–1942), U.S. Navy recipient of the Navy Cross
 Paul Baker (teacher) (1911–2009), American actor, professor, director and author
 Paul Baker Jr. (1921–2011), U.S. Air Force pilot and physicist
 Paul T. Baker (1927–2007), American professor of anthropology
 Paul Baker (footballer) (born 1963), English footballer and football manager
 Paul Baker (cricketer) (born 1968), New Zealand cricketer
 Paul Baker (actor), British theatre actor
 Paul Baker (linguist) (born 1972), British linguist

See also 
 Baker (surname)